Al Jawf is a governorate of Yemen. Its capital is Al Hazm.

As of April 2020, after the Houthi forces' 2020 offensive, nearly all the governorate is under Houthi control, except for Khabb wa ash Sha'af.

On 15 July 2020, a Saudi Arabian airstrike in Al Hazm District in Al-Jawf Governorate killed seven Yemeni civilians. On 17 August 2020, a Houthi missile attack killed 11 government troops, including a senior officer.

Geography

Adjacent governorates

 Hadhramaut Governorate (east)
 Sanaa Governorate (southwest)
 'Amran Governorate (west)
 Saada Governorate (northwest)
 Marib Governorate (south)

Districts
Al Jawf Governorate is divided into the following 12 districts. These districts are further divided into sub-districts, and then further subdivided into villages:

 Al Ghayl District
 Al Hazm District
 Al Humaydat District
 Al Khalq District
 Al Maslub District
 Al Matammah District
 Al Maton District
 Az Zahir District
 Bart Al Anan District
 Khabb wa ash Sha'af District
 Kharab Al Marashi District
 Rajuzah District

References

 
Governorates of Yemen